The Lumières Award for Best Director is an annual award presented by the Académie des Lumières since 1996.

Winners and nominees
Winners are listed first with a blue background, followed by the other nominees.

1990s

2000s

2010s

2020s

Trivia

Multiple awards
 3 awards
 Jacques Audiard

 2 awards
 Abdellatif Kechiche
 Luc Besson
 Roman Polanski
 Maïwenn

Multiple nominees
 4 nominations
 Jacques Audiard

 3 nominations
 Arnaud Desplechin
 Bertrand Bonello
 Philippe Garrel
 Maïwenn

 2 nominations
 Abdellatif Kechiche
 Alain Resnais
 Bertrand Tavernier
 Céline Sciamma
 Laurent Cantet
 Luc Besson
 Mathieu Amalric
 Michel Hazanavicius
 Roman Polanski
 Xavier Giannoli
Albert Dupontel
François Ozon

See also
César Award for Best Director

External links 
 Lumières Award for Best Director at AlloCiné

Director
 
Awards for best director